Kahun Shivapur  is a [Rishing Rural Municipality 1&2 (Nepal)Rishing Rural Municipality in Tanahun District in the Gandaki Zone of central Nepal. At the time of the 1991 Nepal census it had a population of 6162 people living in 927 individual households.

References

External links
UN map of the municipalities of Tanahu District

Populated places in Tanahun District